8888 may refer to:
8888 (Philippines), a national public service hotline
8888 Keystone Crossing, one of the tallest buildings in Indianapolis, Indiana, U.S.
8888 Uprising, a nationwide protest in Myanmar in August 1988
88:88, a 2015 Canadian experimental docudrama film
BS 8888, a British Standard
CONOP 8888, a zombie defence training document
CSX 8888 incident, an incident in 2001 involving American locomotive #8888
8.8.8.8, a Google Public DNS (domain name system)

See also
888 (disambiguation)